History of Charles XII is a historical work by the French historian, philosopher, and writer Voltaire about Charles XII, king of Sweden. It was first published in 1731.

References 

1731 books
18th-century history books
Age of Enlightenment
Works by Voltaire
Charles XII of Sweden